Castianeira alteranda is a species of true spider in the family Corinnidae. It is found in the USA and Canada.

References

 Bradley, Richard A. (2012). Common Spiders of North America. University of California Press.
 Ubick, Darrell (2005). Spiders of North America: An Identification Manual. American Arachnological Society.

Corinnidae
Spiders described in 1942